A Massachusetts general election was held on November 4, 1952 in the Commonwealth of Massachusetts. Primary elections took place on September 16.

At the federal level, Representative John F. Kennedy defeated incumbent Senator Henry Cabot Lodge in a close election.

In the race for Governor, Republican Christian Herter defeated incumbent Democrat Paul Dever. Republicans also defeated incumbent Democrats in the races for Lieutenant Governor and Attorney General.

Governor

Republican Christian Herter was elected over Democratic incumbent Paul A. Dever, Peace Progressive candidate Florence H. Luscomb, Socialist Labor candidate Lawrence Gilfedder, and Prohibition candidate Guy S. Williams.

Lieutenant Governor
Republican Sumner G. Whittier was elected Lieutenant Governor over Democratic incumbent Charles F. Sullivan, Socialist Labor candidate Francis A. Votano, and Prohibition candidate William R. Ferry.

Democratic primary

Candidates
 Thomas B. Brennan, Middlesex County Commissioner
 Edward C. Carroll, former State Senator
 Thomas J. Kurey, businessman
 C. Gerald Lucey, mayor of Brockton
 Joseph L. Murphy, former State Senator
 Charles F. Sullivan, incumbent Lieutenant Governor

Results

Republican primary

Candidates
 Sumner Whittier, State Senator

Results
Sumner Whittier ran unopposed for the Republican nomination for Lt. Governor.

Independents and third parties

Prohibition
 William R. Ferry

Socialist Labor
 Francis A. Votano

General election

Attorney General
Republican George Fingold was elected Attorney General over Democratic incumbent Francis E. Kelly, Socialist Workers candidate Arthur W. Blomen, and Prohibition candidate Howard B. Rand in the general election.

Democratic primary

Candidates
Robert T. Capeless
Francis E. Kelly, incumbent Attorney General
George Leary
John V. Moran

Results

General election

Secretary of the Commonwealth
Incumbent Secretary of the Commonwealth Edward J. Cronin defeated Republican Beatrice Hancock Mullaney, Socialist Labor candidate Fred M. Ingersoll, and Prohibition candidate Alice M. Ferry in the general election.

General election

Treasurer and Receiver-General
Incumbent Treasurer and Receiver-General Foster Furcolo defeated Republican Roy C. Papalia, Socialist Labor candidate Henning A. Blomen, and Prohibition candidate Harold J. Ireland in the general election.

Democratic primary

Candidates
William R. Conley, former State Senator
Cornelius P. Cronin, former Chair of the Boston Housing Authority
James E.V. Donelan, state public works employee
Foster Furcolo, incumbent Treasurer and Receiver-General
John Francis Kennedy, Gillette stockroom supervisor
Jeremiah F. Murphy Jr.
Alexander F. Sullivan, former State Representative

Results

Republican primary

Candidates
Fred J. Burrell, former Treasurer and Receiver-General
Roy C. Papalia, Watertown selectman

Results

General election

Auditor
Incumbent Auditor Thomas J. Buckley defeated Republican David J. Mintz, Socialist Labor candidate Anthony Martin, and Prohibition candidate Robert A. Simmons in the general election.

General election

United States Senate

Democrat John F. Kennedy was elected over Republican incumbent Henry Cabot Lodge Jr., Socialist Labor candidate Thelma Ingersoll, and Prohibition candidate Mark R. Shaw.

See also
 158th Massachusetts General Court (1953–1954)

References

 
Massachusetts